Wolf Von Eckardt (6 March 1918 – 27 August 1995) was a German-American writer, art and architecture critic for the Washington Post.

Life
Wolf Von Eckardt was born in Berlin on 6 March 1918. His mother, Gertrude von Eckardt-Lederer, was Jewish, and his father Emil Lederer was a socialist professor of political economy. His parents divorced when he was a boy. Von Eckardt was excluded from school in Germany for being Jewish. He worked as a printer's apprentice before fleeing Germany in 1936 with a younger sister and their mother. On arrival in the United States, he found work as a printer's apprentice and took classes at the New School for Social Research. He later worked designing book covers for Alfred A. Knopf.  In 1941 he married Karen Horney's daughter Marianne Horney, also a psychoanalyst. During World War II he served in Army intelligence, and after the war worked as an adviser to the West German government. in 1963 he started working at the Washington Post. His marriage to Marianne Horney ended in 1975. In 1981 he left The Post, but wrote about architecture for Time until 1985 and continued teaching and writing until his first stroke in 1989. 

In 1987 Von Eckardt married again, to Nina ffrench-frazier. He died of complications after a stroke on 27 August 1995 at his home in Jaffrey, New Hampshire.

Works
 Eric Mendelsohn, 1960
 Otto Dorfner, 1960
 Mid-century architecture in America: honor awards of the American Institute of Architects, 1949–1961, 1961
 Bulldozers and bureaucrats; cities and urban renewal, 1963
 (with Charles Goodman) Life for dead spaces; the development of the Lavanburg Commons, 1963
 The challenge of Megalopolis: a graphic presentation of the urbanized Northeastern seaboard of the United States, 1964
 A place to live: the crisis of the cities. Foreword by August Heckscher. 1967
 Bertolt Brecht's Berlin: a scrapbook of the twenties, 1975
 Proposal for a National Museum of the Building Arts, 1978
 Back to the drawing board!: Planning livable cities, 1978
 Live the good life!: creating a human community through the arts, 1982
 Oscar Wilde's London: a scrapbook of vices and virtues, 1880–1900, 1987

References

1918 births
1995 deaths
American male journalists
American art critics
American architecture critics
Jewish emigrants from Nazi Germany to the United States
United States Army personnel of World War II
Journalists from Berlin